The Indian Army base in Nagrota, in the Jammu district of the erstwhile Indian state of Jammu and Kashmir was attacked on 29 November 2016 by a group of  Islamist militants.

During the ensuing gun battle, seven Indian soldiers, including two officers and all three militants were killed.

Background
Since the killing of Burhan Wani, Kashmir has seen an increase in violence and civic disobedience. This also increased tensions since the 2016 Uri attack and the ensuing Indian retaliatory surgical strike operation.

Attack
On the morning of 29 November at around 5:30 IST, three militants dressed in Indian police uniforms attacked the Indian Army's 166 Field Regiment unit in the town of Nagrota, near the Jammu city in the state of Jammu and Kashmir. Four Indian Army soldiers, including an officer were killed in the initial gun battle.

The militants then divided themselves into two groups, entered the living quarters of the base and opened fire with AK-47s and grenades. They took into hostage at least two infants, two women and over a dozen soldiers. A stand-off then ensued with the security forces.  According to a statement from the Defence public relations office, "there was [a] hostage-like situation which was successfully neutralised." In the resultant gun battle, all three militants were killed and the hostages were freed by the Indian Army. Three more Indian soldiers, including an officer, were killed in the rescue operation.

See also
List of terrorist incidents in November 2016

References

Attacks on military installations in the 2010s
Deaths by firearm in India
Mass murder in 2016
Islamic terrorism in India
21st-century mass murder in India
November 2016 crimes in Asia
November 2016 events in India
Massacres in Jammu and Kashmir
Terrorist incidents in India in 2016
Attacks on buildings and structures in India
2016 murders in India